The Saint Croix racer (Borikenophis sanctaecrucis) is a possibly extinct species of snake in the family Colubridae. The species is endemic to the island of Saint Croix, United States Virgin Islands.

Etymology
The specific name, sanctaecrucis, refers to the island of Saint Croix, on which the holotype was collected.

Description
It has smooth dorsal scales, which are arranged in 17 rows at midbody.
B. sanctaecrucis is oviparous.

Habitat
The preferred natural habitat of B. sanctaerucis is xeric forest.

Conservation
B. sanctaecrucis is feared extinct; it has not been recorded in over 100 years, since the holotype was collected; St. Croix is a densely-populated, and the species is a fairy large snake. If it is extinct, the most probable causes were due to predation from introduced mongooses and deforestation of its habitat. However, recent rediscoveries of other Caribbean reptiles that were also thought extinct brings hope that a small population (probably less than 50 individuals) of B. sanctaecrucis survives somewhere in St. Croix.

References

Further reading
Boulenger GA (1894). Catalogue of the Snakes in the British Museum (Natural History). Volume II. Containing the Conclusion of the Colubridæ Aglyphæ. London: Trustees of the British Museum (Natural History). (Taylor and Francis, printers). xi + 382 pp. + Plates I-XX. (Dromicus sanctæ-crucis, new combination and emendation, p. 122).
Cope ED (1862). "Synopsis of the Species of Holcosus and Ameiva, with Diagnoses of new West Indian and South American Colubridæ". Proceedings of the Academy of Natural Sciences of Philadelphia 14: 60–82. (Alsophis sancticrucis, new species, p. 76).
Hedges SB, Couloux A, Vidal N (2009). "Molecular phylogeny, classification, and biogeography of West Indian racer snakes of the Tribe Alsophini (Squamata, Dipsadidae, Xenodontinae)". Zootaxa 2067: 1–28. (Borikenophis sanctaecrucis, new combination).
Schwartz A, Henderson RW (1991). Amphibians and Reptiles of the West Indies: Descriptions, Distributions, and Natural History. Gainesville: University of Florida Press. 720 pp. . (Alsophis sanctaecrucis, p. 576).
Schwartz A, Thomas R (1975). A Check-list of West Indian Amphibians and Reptiles. Carnegie Museum of Natural History Special Publication No. 1. Pittsburgh, Pennsylvania: Carnegie Museum of Natural History. 216 pp. (Alsophis sancticrucis, p. 173).

Borikenophis
Endemic fauna of the United States Virgin Islands
Reptiles of the United States Virgin Islands
Reptiles described in 1862
Taxonomy articles created by Polbot